Cape Lookout Village Historic District is a national historic district located near Core Banks, Carteret County, North Carolina. It encompasses 20 contributing buildings 1 contributing site, and 6 contributing structures in Cape Lookout Village.  The buildings include notable examples of Queen Anne and Bungalow / American Craftsman style architecture. The district includes two government complexes: the Cape Lookout Lighthouse Station and the Cape Lookout Coast Guard Station. In addition, 14 buildings, a long dock, and the circulation network, as well as the landscape in which these lie, compose the district.  The buildings include the Life Saving Station (1888) and Boathouse, the Keeper's Quarters (1907), Luther Guthrie House, Gaskill-Guthrie House, Seifert-Davis House (Coca-Cola House), Baker-Holderness House (Casablanca, c. 1930), the Bryant House, and the Carrie Arendell Davis House.

It was listed on the National Register of Historic Places in 2000.

References

Historic districts on the National Register of Historic Places in North Carolina
Queen Anne architecture in North Carolina
Buildings and structures in Carteret County, North Carolina
National Register of Historic Places in Carteret County, North Carolina
Ghost towns in North Carolina
Populated places on the National Register of Historic Places in North Carolina